This is a list of Assyrian populations by country according to official and estimated numbers. Due to a lack of official data in many countries, estimates may vary.

See also
Assyrian–Chaldean–Syriac diaspora

References